Howard T. Sawhill City Park, also known as St. Francis City Park, is a park in St. Francis, Kansas, United States.  It was listed as a historic district on the National Register of Historic Places on July 10, 2008.

The park has a band shell and an oval amphitheater and a flagpole.  It is laid out around a central fountain.

References

Parks on the National Register of Historic Places in Kansas
Protected areas of Cheyenne County, Kansas
Historic districts on the National Register of Historic Places in Kansas
National Register of Historic Places in Cheyenne County, Kansas
Amphitheaters on the National Register of Historic Places